Major general Jaroslav Čihák (24 July 1891 – 30 April 1944) was an Austro-Hungarian army officer from 1914 and Russian legionary from 1916 (command platoon and battalion). 

Čihák was born in Kratonohy. Between the wars he was battalion commander, second in regiment command and regiment commander. From 1936 he was commander of the infantry school in Milovice. After beginning of Nazi occupation he left Czechoslovakia. In 1940 he was commander of Czechoslovak troops in conflicts on the German-French front (so-called divisional infantry). He was Executive officer of National defence department in Britain (Czechoslovak government in exile) from July 1940 to January 1941.
He participated in the building of the Czechoslovak army in foreign countries. He died in London.

External links
 Gallery of Executive officers of NDD (in Czech) 

1891 births
1944 deaths
People from Hradec Králové District
People from the Kingdom of Bohemia
Czech generals
Chiefs of the General Staff (Czechoslovakia)
Austro-Hungarian military personnel of World War I
Czechoslovak Legion personnel
Czech resistance members
Knights of the Order of the Falcon (Czechoslovakia)